Leigh “Joey” Montagna (born 2 November 1983) is a former professional Australian rules footballer who played for the St Kilda Football Club in the Australian Football League (AFL). A two time All-Australian, Montagna finished his career 7th on the all-time games list for St Kilda with 287 games and was top three in St Kilda's best and fairest—the Trevor Barker Award—on five occasions.

AFL career

2002–2006
Montagna was recruited from the Northern Knights in the TAC Cup under-18s as the number-37 draft pick in round 2 of the 2001 AFL draft by St Kilda. He played his first game wearing number 28 for St Kilda in round 2 of the 2002 AFL season against the Collingwood Football Club.

Montagna played in St Kilda's 2004 Wizard Home Loans Cup–winning side.

By this point, Montagna was establishing himself as a core part of the St Kilda team, setting a then club record for consecutive wins between round 1 and round 10 in the 2004 AFL season. Montagna did not play in the finals series, and St Kilda eventually fell six points short on the scoreboard in the Preliminary Final after qualifying for the finals series in third position.

Consolidating himself in the senior team, he went on to play 22 games for the season, leading the club in inside-50s, running bounces, and was top-five in tackles and hard-ball gets. He averaged over 19 disposals per game.

2007–2011
In Round 8, 2007, in a match against Hawthorn, Montagna suffered a broken jaw but only missed one week with the injury.  Although 2007 was the first since 2003 that St Kilda had missed out on playing in the finals series, it was the season that saw Montagna become a top-tier AFL footballer. Montagna played consistently throughout the season and continued the improvement he had shown in 2006. He played an accountable and hard-running role through St Kilda's midfield, averaging 24 disposals and 3 tackles per game and kicking 10 goals for the year. Some of Montagna's highlights for the year included best-on-ground performances against the Kangaroos, Richmond and Hawthorn in the second half of the year. Montagna was rewarded for his efforts with a third-place finish in St Kilda's 2007 best and fairest.

Montagna played in St Kilda's 2008 NAB Cup–winning side—the club's third pre-season cup win. St Kilda defeated Richmond,  and Essendon on the way to the grand final. 2008 saw Montagna continue to become vital in the St Kilda's midfield. St Kilda qualified fourth for the finals series and were defeated in the preliminary final by eventual premiers, Hawthorn. He finished the year with the most kicks in the competition and second for inside-50s. His season was rewarded by being selected for the first time to represent Australia against Ireland in the International Rules series.

Montagna's 100th game for St Kilda was in Round 2 of the 2009 AFL season against Adelaide at AAMI Stadium, which St Kilda won by 32 points. He played in 21 of 22 matches in the 2009 home-and-away season, where St Kilda won the minor premiership and qualified in first position for the finals series. A new club record of 19 consecutive wins between rounds 1 and 19 was set, the equal-third-best in league history. The club completed its best-ever home-and-away season with 20 wins and 2 losses. 
He played in the 2009 AFL Grand Final in which St Kilda lost by 12 points. Montagna averaged 27.9 disposals and 6.25 tackles in 2009 and was named in the 2009 All-Australian team for the first time. His season saw him become one of the best players in the competition. Considered a Brownlow Medal contender in 2009, Montagna took out a third-place finish in a tight St Kilda best-and-fairest count as well as earning an All-Australian position for the first time.

Montagna played 26 games in 2010, including the infamous draw and replay grand finals, averaging 28.6 possessions. He finished second in St Kilda's best-and-fairest award (Trevor Barker Medal), was selected in the AFL's All-Australian team for the second year in a row, finished in the top 10 in the Brownlow medal, and capped off the year by representing Australia in the International Rules series for the second time.

Leigh Montagna played his 150th game against Richmond in a draw in Round 2 of the 2011 AFL season at the Melbourne Cricket Ground.

2012–2017

The departure of Ross Lyon at the end of the 2011 season resulted in the beginning of a complete rebuild for St Kilda; and, despite the retirements and movement of many of his senior teammates, Montagna remained a model of consistency and a key leader through the rebuild. He played 102 out of 110 games in that period, averaging 26.4 disposals and finishing fourth in the club best and fairest as well as representing Australia on two more occasions.
 
2016 saw Montagna play across half-back for the first time in his career; he excelled in that role, averaging 29.2 disposals per game and helped lead the club to within percentage points of playing finals for the first time since 2011.

At the conclusion of the 2017 season, Montagna announced his retirement from the AFL. In February 2019, he was appointed as a Melbourne-based opposition analyst for Fremantle Football Club.

Statistics
 

|- style="background-color: #EAEAEA"
! scope="row" style="text-align:center" | 2002
|style="text-align:center;"|
| 28 || 1 || 0 || 0 || 3 || 1 || 4 || 3 || 2 || 0.0 || 0.0 || 3.0 || 1.0 || 4.0 || 3.0 || 2.0
|-
! scope="row" style="text-align:center" | 2003
|style="text-align:center;"|
| 28 || 12 || 12 || 3 || 73 || 52 || 125 || 30 || 18 || 1.0 || 0.3 || 6.1 || 4.3 || 10.4 || 2.5 || 1.5
|- style="background-color: #EAEAEA"
! scope="row" style="text-align:center" | 2004
|style="text-align:center;"|
| 28 || 9 || 9 || 2 || 58 || 43 || 101 || 28 || 25 || 1.0 || 0.2 || 6.4 || 4.8 || 11.2 || 3.1 || 2.8
|-
! scope="row" style="text-align:center" | 2005
|style="text-align:center;"|
| 11 || 8 || 6 || 3 || 78 || 43 || 121 || 35 || 19 || 0.8 || 0.4 || 9.8 || 5.4 || 15.1 || 4.4 || 2.4
|- style="background-color: #EAEAEA"
! scope="row" style="text-align:center" | 2006
|style="text-align:center;"|
| 11 || 22 || 12 || 14 || 270 || 151 || 421 || 106 || 81 || 0.5 || 0.6 || 12.3 || 6.9 || 19.1 || 4.8 || 3.7
|-
! scope="row" style="text-align:center" | 2007
|style="text-align:center;"|
| 11 || 21 || 10 || 12 || 339 || 163 || 502 || 108 || 75 || 0.5 || 0.6 || 16.1 || 7.8 || 23.9 || 5.1 || 3.6
|- style="background-color: #EAEAEA"
! scope="row" style="text-align:center" | 2008
|style="text-align:center;"|
| 11 || 25 || 12 || 11 || 388 || 179 || 567 || 118 || 82 || 0.5 || 0.4 || 15.5 || 7.2 || 22.7 || 4.7 || 3.3
|-
! scope="row" style="text-align:center" | 2009
|style="text-align:center;"|
| 11 || 24 || 8 || 19 || 399 || 271 || 670 || 123 || 150 || 0.3 || 0.8 || 16.6 || 11.3 || 27.9 || 5.1 || 6.3
|- style="background-color: #EAEAEA"
! scope="row" style="text-align:center" | 2010
|style="text-align:center;"|
| 11 || 26 || 18 || 17 || 429 || 316 || 745 || 111 || 126 || 0.7 || 0.7 || 16.5 || 12.2 || 28.7 || 4.3 || 4.8
|-
! scope="row" style="text-align:center" | 2011
|style="text-align:center;"|
| 11 || 21 || 13 || 10 || 335 || 171 || 506 || 88 || 94 || 0.6 || 0.5 || 16.0 || 8.1 || 24.1 || 4.2 || 4.5
|- style="background-color: #EAEAEA"
! scope="row" style="text-align:center" | 2012
|style="text-align:center;"|
| 11 || 22 || 13 || 8 || 324 || 194 || 518 || 100 || 104 || 0.6 || 0.4 || 14.7 || 8.8 || 23.5 || 4.5 || 4.7
|-
! scope="row" style="text-align:center" | 2013
|style="text-align:center;"|
| 11 || 21 || 16 || 8 || 395 || 226 || 621 || 101 || 82 || 0.8 || 0.4 || 18.8 || 10.8 || 29.6 || 4.8 || 3.9
|- style="background-color: #EAEAEA"
! scope="row" style="text-align:center" | 2014
|style="text-align:center;"|
| 11 || 20 || 9 || 5 || 310 || 160 || 470 || 79 || 80 || 0.5 || 0.3 || 15.5 || 8.0 || 23.5 || 4.0 || 4.0
|-
! scope="row" style="text-align:center" | 2015
|style="text-align:center;"|
| 11 || 17 || 8 || 9 || 277 || 209 || 486 || 85 || 82 || 0.5 || 0.5 || 16.3 || 12.3 || 28.6 || 5.0 || 4.8
|- style="background-color: #EAEAEA"
! scope="row" style="text-align:center" | 2016
|style="text-align:center;"|
| 11 || 22 || 4 || 4 || 339 || 249 || 588 || 135 || 60 || 0.2 || 0.2 || 15.4 || 11.3 || 26.7 || 6.1 || 2.7
|-
! scope="row" style="text-align:center" | 2017
|style="text-align:center;"|
| 11 || 16 || 5 || 1 || 235 || 165 || 400 || 96 || 59 || 0.3 || 0.1 || 14.7 || 10.3 || 25.0 || 6.0 || 3.7
|- class="sortbottom"
! colspan=3| Career
! 287
! 155
! 126
! 4252
! 2593
! 6845
! 1346
! 1139
! 0.5
! 0.4
! 14.8
! 9.0
! 23.9
! 4.7
! 4.0
|}

Personal life
In 2014, Montagna married his girlfriend of six years, Erinn Byrne. Montagna, being of Italian heritage, has said that his surname is pronounced the traditional Italian way: Mon-tan-ya. However, Montagna says that he personally prefers the alternate pronunciation: Mon-tag-na.

References

External links

 
 

1983 births
Living people
Australian rules footballers from Victoria (Australia)
St Kilda Football Club players
All-Australians (AFL)
Northern Knights players
Australian people of Italian descent
Australia international rules football team players
People educated at Marcellin College, Bulleen